A Twist of Fate is an EP by singer John Arch, released on June 17, 2003 through Metal Blade Records. At the time, the EP was Arch's first musical work in over seventeen years since leaving progressive metal band Fates Warning in 1987, with whom he recorded their first three albums; the last being Awaken the Guardian (1986). Consisting of two tracks, A Twist of Fate features Fates Warning founder and guitarist Jim Matheos, with whom Arch would later release a collaborative album in 2011, entitled Sympathetic Resonance, under the banner of Arch/Matheos. Also among the line-up are former Dream Theater drummer Mike Portnoy and current Fates Warning bassist Joey Vera.

Track listing

Personnel
John Arch – vocals, production
Jim Matheos – guitar, keyboard, engineering, production
Mike Portnoy – drums
Joey Vera – bass, engineering
Andy Happel – cello, violin
Phil Magnotti – engineering, mixing, mastering

References

External links
John Arch Speaks Out On 'A Twist Of Fate' at Blabbermouth

2003 EPs
Metal Blade Records albums